Yelena Nechayeva (born 14 June 1979) is a Russian fencer. She competed in the women's sabre events at the 2004 and 2008 Summer Olympics.

References

1979 births
Living people
Russian female sabre fencers
Olympic fencers of Russia
Fencers at the 2004 Summer Olympics
Fencers at the 2008 Summer Olympics
Sportspeople from Saint Petersburg
Universiade medalists in fencing
Universiade silver medalists for Russia
Medalists at the 2003 Summer Universiade
Medalists at the 2005 Summer Universiade
21st-century Russian women